Wigginsia may refer to the following genera:
 , in family Acarnidae
 Wigginsia, a plant, junior synonym of Parodia